The 1994 FIBA World Championship was the 12th FIBA World Championship, the international basketball world championship for men's teams. The tournament was hosted by Canada from August 4 to 14, 1994. The tournament was held at SkyDome and Maple Leaf Gardens in Toronto as well as at Copps Coliseum in Hamilton. The hosting duties were originally awarded to Belgrade, Yugoslavia, but after United Nations limited participation in sporting events in Yugoslavia, Toronto stepped in as a replacement option in 1992.

The 1994 FIBA World Championship was the first time that the FIBA World Championship (now called the FIBA Basketball World Cup) allowed current American NBA players that had already played in an official NBA regular season game to participate. Prior to that only professionals from other leagues were allowed to compete, since players from other leagues were still considered amateurs.

The tournament was won by the United States's "Dream Team II", who beat Russia 137–91 in the Final. The United States finished with a perfect 8–0 record (8 wins and 0 losses). The bronze medal was won by Croatia who beat Greece 78–60 in the bronze-medal game.

Venues
Three stadia were used during the tournament:

Qualification
There were 16 teams taking part in the 1994 World Cup of Basketball. After the 1992 Olympics, the continental allocation for FIBA Americas was reduced by one when the United States won the Olympic tournament, automatically qualifying them for the 1994 World Cup.

 Host nation: 1 berth
 1992 Summer Olympics: 12 teams competing for 1 berth, removed from that country's FIBA zone.
 FIBA Oceania: 3 teams competing for 1 berth
 FIBA Europe: 16 teams competing for 5 berths
 FIBA Americas: 10 teams competing for 4 berths
 FIBA Africa: 9 teams competing for 2 berths
 FIBA Asia: 18 teams competing for 2 berths

Qualified teams

*  withdrew from the tournament,  replaced them.

Draw

Preliminary round
The top two teams from each group remain in medal contention.

Group A

Group B

Group C

Group D

Quarterfinal round
The top two finishers from Groups I and II advance to the final round.

Group I

Group II

9th–16th classification

Quarterfinal round

Group III

Group IV

13th–16th classification

Semifinals

Fifteenth place playoff

Thirteenth place playoff

9th–12th classification

Semifinals

Eleventh place playoff

Ninth place playoff

5th–8th classification

Semifinals

Seventh place playoff

Fifth place playoff

Final round

Semifinals

Third place playoff

Final

Awards

All-Tournament Team

 Sergei Bazarevich
 Reggie Miller
 Shawn Kemp
 Dino Rađa
 Shaquille O'Neal — MVP 
Source:

Top scorers (ppg)

  Andrew Gaze 23.9
  Dino Rađa 22.4
  Arijan Komazec 19.4
  Hur Jae 19.4
  Paolo de Almeida 19.4
  Moon Kyung-Eun 19
  Richard Matienzo 18.8
  Shaquille O'Neal 18
  Marcelo Nicola 17.7
  Reggie Miller 17.1

Final rankings

References

External links
1994 FIBA World Championship
 
 

 
1994
International basketball competitions hosted by Canada
1994 in basketball
1994–95 in Canadian basketball
International sports competitions in Toronto
August 1994 sports events in Canada
Basketball competitions in Toronto
1994 in Toronto